San Bernardo is a railway interchange station of metro and suburban trains services of Seville, Andalusia. It is located at the intersection of the avenues of La Enramadilla and La Buhaira in the neighborhood of San Bernardo. San Bernardo is an underground station of line 1 of the metro and the lines C-1 and C-4 of the suburban trains. The suburban station was opened to the public in 1992 while the metro station was inaugurated on 2 April 2009, and opened on 15 April 2011. It is also a terminus for the Metrocentro tram line.

See also
 List of Seville metro stations

References

External links 
  Official site.
 History, construction details and maps.

Seville Metro stations
Cercanías Sevilla stations
Railway stations in Andalusia
Railway stations opened in 1992
Railway stations in Spain opened in 2009